NH 108 may refer to:

 National Highway 108 (India)
 New Hampshire Route 108, United States